Byala is a town in Ruse Province, Northern Bulgaria. It is the administrative centre of the homonymous Byala Municipality. The town is located on the crossroad between roads that connect Ruse with Veliko Tarnovo and Pleven with Varna. Close to it is the town of Borovo. The noted Belenski most (Byala Bridge) over the Yantra River is located in the vicinity. The Liberation War Museum dedicated to the Russo-Turkish War can also be found in the town. As of December 2009, Byala has a population of 9,015 inhabitants.

Trivia 
A major traffic accident on 7 December 2006 on a different bridge over the river claimed 18 lives, as a truck hit a bus travelling between Byala and its railway station, causing the bus to fall 15 m down from the bridge.

References

Towns in Bulgaria
Populated places in Ruse Province